Sternotomis flavomaculata is a species of beetle in the family Cerambycidae. It was described by Hintz in 1919. It is known from Kenya, Cameroon, and the Democratic Republic of the Congo.

Varietas
 Sternotomis flavomaculata var. semirubra Breuning, 1935
 Sternotomis flavomaculata var. flavescens Breuning, 1935
 Sternotomis flavomaculata var. virens Breuning, 1935

References

Sternotomini
Beetles described in 1919